Euthalius was a deacon of Alexandria and later Bishop of Sulca. He lived sometime between the 4th and 7th centuries and is chiefly known through his work on the New Testament in particular as the author of the "Euthalian Sections".

Of Euthalius' activities as a bishop little or nothing is known. Even the location of his episcopal see, Sulca, is a matter of doubt. It can hardly be identified with the see of that name in Sardinia. More likely it was situated somewhere in Egypt, and it has been conjectured that it is the same as Psilka, a city of the Thebaid in the neighbourhood of Syene.

Works

It is well known that the divisions into chapters and verses with which we are familiar were entirely wanting in the original and early copies of the New Testament writings; there was even no perceptible space between words. To obviate the manifest inconveniences arising from this condition of the text, Ammonius of Alexandria, in the third century, conceived the idea of dividing the Four Gospels into sections, varying in size according to the substance of the narrative embodied in them, and Euthalius, following up the same idea, extended a similar system of division to the other books of the New Testament with the exception of the Book of Revelation.

So obvious were the advantages of the scheme that it was soon adopted throughout the Greek Church. As divisions of the text these sections have no longer any intrinsic value. But as they were at a given period adopted in nearly all the Churches and noted by the copyists, they are valuable as chronological indications, their presence or absence being an important circumstance in determining the antiquity of a manuscript.

Other labours of Euthalius in connection with the text of the New Testament refer to the division of the text into larger sections or lessons to be read in the liturgical services, and to the more minute divisions of the text called verses. The custom of reading portions of the New Testament in the public liturgical services was already ancient in the Church, but with regard to the choice and delimitation of the passages there was little or no uniformity, the Churches having, for the most part, each its own series of selections. Euthalius elaborated a scheme of divisions which was soon universally adopted. Neither the Gospels nor the Apocalypse enter into this series, but the other portions of the New Testament are divided into 57 sections of varying length, 53 of which are assigned to the Sundays of the year, while the remaining four refer probably to Christmas, the Epiphany, Good Friday and Easter.

The idea of dividing the Scriptures into verses did not originate with Euthalius. It had already been applied to portions of the Old Testament, especially to the poetical parts, and even to some parts of the New Testament. Here, as with regard to the other divisions, Euthalius only carried out systematically and completed a scheme which had been but partially and imperfectly realized by others, and his work marks a stage of that progress which led finally to punctuation of the text. These  were of unequal length, either containing a few words forming a complete sense, or as many as could be conveniently uttered with one breath. Thus, for instance, the Epistle to the Romans contained 920 of these verses; Galatians, 293; Hebrews, 703; Philemon, 37, and so on.

Besides these textual labours, Euthalius framed a catalogue of the quotations from the Old Testament and from profane authors which are found in the New Testament writings. He also wrote a short Life of St. Paul and a series of "Argumenta" or short summaries which are placed by way of introduction to the different books of the New Testament.

After having long lain in oblivion, the works of Euthalius were published in Rome, in 1698, by Lorenzo Alessandro Zaccagni, Prefect of the Vatican Library. They are embodied in the first volume of his Collectanea Monumentorum Veterum Ecclesiæ Græcæ ac Latinæ. They can also be found in Gallandi (Biblioth. Pat., X, 197) and in Migne (Patrologia Graeca, LXXXV, 621).

See also
Euthalian Apparatus

References

Ancient Alexandrians
5th-century Byzantine bishops